Bruce Dorminey (born March 8, 1959) is an   American  science journalist and author who primarily covers aerospace, astronomy and astrophysics. He is a regular contributor to Astronomy magazine. Since March 2012, he has written a regular tech column for Forbes.com.  He was also a correspondent for Renewable Energy World. He is host of the weekly aerospace and astronomy podcast, The Cosmic Controversy Podcast.

Biography

Dorminey grew up and attended public schools in the small rural town of Ocilla, Georgia, and is a graduate of Irwin County High School and the University of Washington in Seattle. He began his print journalism career in 1988 in New York and then began reporting from Europe, primarily as a film and arts correspondent, mostly for newspaper outlets such as the International Herald Tribune, the Boston Globe, the Dallas Morning News and Canada's The Globe and Mail.  While in Europe, he also wrote political and business-related stories.

Distant Wanderers 
Distant Wanderers: The Search for Planets Beyond the Solar System is a book, written by Dorminey, which reports on astronomical research and theory related to the search for extrasolar planets, as of the publication date of 2001. It received reviews from publications including Astronomy magazine,  USA Today, and New Scientist

Awards 

Dorminey was a 1998 winner in the Royal Aeronautical Society's Aerospace Journalist of the Year Awards (AJOYA) in the "Best Systems or Technology Submission" category for a Financial Times article on the European Space Agency’s HIPPARCOS mission.  
 
In 2004, Dorminey was a founding team member of the NASA Astrobiology Institute's Science Communication Focus Group.

References

External links
Dorminey's column in Forbes

Living people
1959 births
American science journalists
American male journalists